The Abner F. Hodgins House is a historic house in Winona, Minnesota, United States.  It was built in 1890 for Hodgins (1826–1896), a successful lumber executive.  The house was listed on the National Register of Historic Places in 1984 for its local significance in the themes of architecture and industry.  It was nominated for being an outstanding example of a Queen Anne-style house and for being the home of a notable leader in the key industry behind Winona's early prominence.

See also
 National Register of Historic Places listings in Winona County, Minnesota

References

1890 establishments in Minnesota
Buildings and structures in Winona, Minnesota
Houses completed in 1890
Houses in Winona County, Minnesota
Houses on the National Register of Historic Places in Minnesota
National Register of Historic Places in Winona County, Minnesota
Queen Anne architecture in Minnesota